Mowniyeh or Muneyeh may refer to:
 Muneyeh, Isfahan
 Mowniyeh, Tehran